The Long Memory is a black-and-white 1953 British crime film directed by Robert Hamer and based on the 1951 novel of the same title by Howard Clewes. 

Filmed at locations such as London Waterloo railway station, the North Kent Marshes on the Thames Estuary, and the dingy backstreets of Gravesend, Kent, mainly Queen Street, its bleak setting and grim atmosphere have led to its acclaim as a British example of film noir.

Plot

Phillip Davidson boards a boat and embraces Fay Driver. Then he goes down below to try to convince her alcoholic father, Captain Driver, not to involve Fay in his criminal activity. However, Boyd brings aboard Delaney (a man he has agreed to smuggle out of the country) and two henchmen. When Boyd demands that Delaney pay him £500, rather than £200, a fight erupts, and Boyd knocks Delaney out. A broken oil lamp starts a fire, attracting the attention of the authorities, and Philip is fished out of the water. A charred corpse is found in the sunken boat. The Drivers and Tim Pewsey perjure themselves by identifying the dead man as Boyd, rather than Delaney, and claiming there was no other man present. This leads to Philip's conviction for Boyd's murder. Granted parole, he is released after 12 years in prison.

Upon release, he sets out to get even with the witnesses. He is kept under surveillance by the police on the orders of Superintendent Bob Lowther, who is now married to Fay. Philip finds an abandoned barge claimed by Jackson, a kindly old hermit. His plan is to live rough on the barge while he searches for the witnesses. But three people attempt – initially unsuccessfully – to befriend him. First, Jackson withdraws an initial request for rent. Then Craig, a newspaperman who suspects him to be innocent, arrives; Philip throws him out, but Craig tumbles down an open hatch and is knocked unconscious, and Philip rescues him. Finally, he happens upon a sailor attempting to rape Ilse, a traumatised refugee. When he rescues her and allows her to stay on the barge, she falls in love with him.

Informed by Craig that Captain Driver has died, four years earlier, Philip stalks Pewsey, with Lowther and Craig on his trail. Pewsey is frightened into confessing to Lowther that there was another man present at the murder. Now Lowther's marriage comes under increasing tension as he considers the possibility of his wife's perjury. Finally, she confesses she did lie to protect her father. Lowther tells her that she will have to turn herself in and he will have to resign. She asks for time, and goes to see "George Berry", who turns out to be Boyd. She asks him for money and they plan to leave the country together.

Ilse pleads with Philip to give up his dream of revenge and start a new life with her. He confronts Fay in her home, but realises that Ilse is right, and walks away.

When Fay realises Boyd is not coming, she attempts suicide by trying to jump in front of an oncoming Waterloo & City line train, but is stopped by other people on the platform. She leaves with police sent by her husband after he read her farewell note.

By sheer chance, Philip is then hired to deliver an urgent letter to "Berry". Philip confronts Boyd in his office, initially with a gun, but he throws this aside, deciding to fight like men, but when Boyd picks up the gun Philip runs away. It is time for Boyd to meet Fay at London Waterloo railway station, but he pursues Philip and shoots him in the arm.

Philip flees to the barge, but Boyd is waiting for him. After a chase, Boyd is about to kill Philip when he is shot dead by Jackson.

Ilse and Philip refuse further help from the police. They are left to deal with their pasts and face the future together.

Cast

 John Mills as Phillip Davidson
 John McCallum as Superintendent Bob Lowther
 Elizabeth Sellars as Fay Lowther
 Eva Bergh as Ilse
 Geoffrey Keen as Craig, a newspaperman
 Michael Martin Harvey as Jackson
 John Chandos as Spencer Boyd, alias George Berry
 John Slater as Tim Pewsey
 Thora Hird as Mrs Pewsey
 Vida Hope as Alice Gedge
 Harold Lang as Boyd's chauffeur/receptionist 
 Mary Mackenzie as Gladys
 John Glyn-Jones as Gedge
 John Horsley as Bletchley
 Fred Johnson as Driver
 Laurence Naismith as Hasbury
 Peter Jones as Fisher, another reporter
 Christopher Beeny as Mickey, the Lowthers' son
 Ernest Clark as Prosecuting Counsel (uncredited)
 Henry Edwards as Judge (uncredited)
 Arthur Mullard as Police Constable (uncredited)
 Denis Shaw as Shaw (uncredited)
 Julian Somers as Delaney (uncredited)
 Russell Waters as Scotson (uncredited)

Production
The film was made at Pinewood Studios and on location in Kent around Gravesend and at Shad Thames, a street next to Tower Bridge in central London. Many of the houses shown in the film were demolished soon afterwards. It was the last film of Henry Edwards, a major British star of the 1920s and 1930s, who had a small role as a judge early in the film.

Premiere and reception
The film received its gala premiere at the Leicester Square Theatre on 22 January 1953, with Prince Henry, Duke of Gloucester and Princess Alice, Duchess of Gloucester as guests of honour, and entered general release the following day. The Times film reviewer found the film a bit dull and self-important, but gave director Hamer credit for "effective use of the film's natural background, the mud and desolation of the flats of the Thames Estuary."

References

External links 
 
 
 
 The Long Memory at Ferdy on Films
 Britmovie: Film locations

1950s thriller films
1953 crime drama films
1953 films
British crime drama films
Film noir
Films based on British novels
Films based on crime novels
British films about revenge
Films directed by Robert Hamer
Films set in Kent
Films set in London
Films shot at Pinewood Studios
Films scored by William Alwyn
British black-and-white films
1950s English-language films
1950s British films